The Viking League (German: Bund Wiking) was a German political and paramilitary organization in existence from 1923 to 1928. It was founded on 2 May 1923 in Munich by members of the banned Organisation Consul as the successor to this group.

Although its stated purpose was to effect "the revival of Germany on a national and ethnic basis through the spiritual education of its members", its actual primary purpose was to contribute to preparations for the overthrow of the Weimar Republic and provide intensive military training for its members. Membership was estimated to be about 10,000 persons, including many former military officers. Juvenile supporters could join the Young Vikings (Jungwiking) youth wing.

Leaders of the group included former Marinebrigade Ehrhardt founder Hermann Ehrhardt and his deputy, Commander Eberhard Kautter. Many leaders of other banned or controversial right-wing organizations used membership in the Viking League as a way of keeping continuity for their causes. For example, this included later Nazi Reich Health Leader Leonardo Conti, who had founded the anti-semitic newspaper Kampfbund in 1918. The young Horst Wessel joined the group in late 1923.

On 9 January 1924 a group of about 20 members of the Viking League led by Edgar Julius Jung were responsible for the murder of the Pfalz separatist Heinz-Orbis.

The stated aim of the League was the establishment of a new German military dictatorship and modification of the Treaty of Versailles by armed means. This included targeted provocation intended to incite workers to take action and provide the pretext for a coup. When these preparations became known to the federal government in 1926, the Viking League was banned in Prussia and other areas.

After the dissolution of the League on 27 April 1928, many Viking League members continued their activities in related organizations such as Der Stahlhelm or the Nazi Sturmabteilung (SA).

References 

Paramilitary organisations of the Weimar Republic
Anti-communism in Germany
1923 establishments in Germany
Far-right politics in Germany
Anti-communist organizations